The 2011 Kent State Golden Flashes football team represented Kent State University in the 2011 NCAA Division I FBS football season. The Golden Flashes were led by first-year head coach Darrell Hazell and played their home games at Dix Stadium. They are a member of the East Division of the Mid-American Conference. They finished the season 5–7, 4–4 in MAC play to finish in third place in the East Division.

Schedule

References

Kent State
Kent State Golden Flashes football seasons
Kent State Golden Flashes football